Bathytoma mitchelsoni is an extinct species of sea snail, a marine gastropod mollusk in the family Borsoniidae.

Distribution
This extinct marine species is endemic to New Zealand .

Description

References

 Maxwell, P.A. (2009). Cenozoic Mollusca. pp 232–254 in Gordon, D.P. (ed.) New Zealand inventory of biodiversity. Volume one. Kingdom Animalia: Radiata, Lophotrochozoa, Deuterostomia. Canterbury University Press, Christchurch. 
 Powell A.W.B. (1935), Tertiary Mollusca from Motutara, West Coast, Auckland; Records of the Auckland Institute and Museum Vol. 1, No. 6 (26 September 1935), pp. 327–340

mitchelsoni
Gastropods of New Zealand